Vladimir Petrov (22 July 1896 – 7 January 1966) was a Soviet film director and screenwriter. He directed 24 films between 1928 and 1964. Vladimir Petrov was awarded Stalin Prize five times: in 1941 (twice), 1946 (twice) and 1950.

Filmography
 Golden Honey (Золотой мед); 1928
 Joy and Druzhok (Джой и Дружок); 1928
 Icy Fate (Ледяная судьба); 1929
 Lenin's Address (Адрес Ленина); 1929
 Fritz Bauer (Фриц Бауэр); 1930
 The Dam (Плотина); 1931
 The Fugitive (Беглец); 1932
 The Storm (Гроза); 1933
 Pyotr pervyy (Петр Первый); 1937–1938
 Chapaev with Us (Чапаев с нами); 1941, short
 Elusive Ian (Неуловимый Ян); 1942
 Kutuzov (Кутузов); 1943
 Jubilee (Юбилей); 1944
 Guilty Without Guilt (Без вины виноватые); 1945
 The Battle of Stalingrad (Сталинградская битва); 1949–1950
 Sporting Honour (Спортивная честь); 1951
 The Inspector-General (Ревизор); 1952
 Three Hundred Years Ago (300 лет тому...); 1956
 Duel (Поединок); 1957
  (Накануне)
 First Lesson (Первый урок); 1960
  (Русский лес); 1963

References

External links

Soviet film directors
Stalin Prize winners
1896 births
1966 deaths